Eoophyla tanzanica is a moth in the family Crambidae. It was described by David John Lawrence Agassiz in 2012. It is found in Tanzania.

The wingspan is 12–20 mm. The base of the forewings is fuscous, enclosing an orange spot. There are whitish subbasal and antemedian fasciae separated by fuscous and orange scaling. The base of the hindwings is pale fuscous, becoming darker towards the white median fascia.

Etymology
The species is named for Tanzania, the country where the species is found.

References

Eoophyla
Moths described in 2012